Fresh Mart is a Thai chain of convenience stores, with locations nationwide. Fresh Mart is part of Fresh Mart International Public Co.Ltd

Shops 
As of 2011, the company operated 600 Fresh Marts.

References

External links
Fresh Mart Official Website

Retail companies of Thailand
Convenience stores